George Michael "Dummy" Leitner (June 19, 1871 – February 20, 1960) was an American professional baseball pitcher. He played in Major League Baseball (MLB) for two seasons for the Philadelphia Athletics (1901), New York Giants (1901), Cleveland Bronchos (1902), and Chicago White Sox (1902).

Leitner was deaf, and like other deaf baseball players of his era, was nicknamed "Dummy". Three members of the 1901 Giants pitching staff shared that nickname: Leitner, Deegan, and Taylor.

Leitner had a deaf sister, Lydia (died at 21), and a deaf brother, Frank, who was active in Pittsburgh. He married a deaf woman named Helen (née Wells) and had two children, a deaf daughter named Helen who was later married to deaf August Wriede, and a hearing son named Clarence Wells Leitner who was known for his intelligence in writing and editing for the Evening Sun and North East newspaper for the city of Baltimore. George and Clarence Leitner and August Wriede all worked for The Baltimore Sun. Leitner died in Baltimore at the age of 88.

References

External links 

1871 births
1960 deaths
Major League Baseball pitchers
Philadelphia Athletics players
New York Giants (NL) players
Cleveland Bronchos players
Chicago White Sox players
Norfolk Skippers players
Baton Rouge Cajuns players
Baseball players from Maryland
People from Parkton, Maryland
Deaf baseball players
American deaf people